The 1974–75 FA Trophy was the sixth season of the FA Trophy.

Preliminary round

Ties

Replays

2nd replays

First qualifying round

Ties

Replays

2nd replay

Second qualifying round

Ties

Replays

2nd replay

3rd replay

Third qualifying round

Ties

Replays

2nd replay

1st round
The teams that given byes to this round are Morecambe, Scarborough, Stafford Rangers, Barrow, Telford United, Macclesfield Town, Hillingdon Borough, Wimbledon, Worcester City, Romford, Weymouth, Wigan Athletic, Bangor City, Bromsgrove Rovers, Burscough, Chelmsford City, Grantham, Buxton, Bedford Town, Dover, Hastings United, Stourbridge, Dartford, South Liverpool, Ashford Town, Bexley United, Kettering Town, Boston United, Gateshead United, Sandbach Ramblers, Banbury United and Merthyr Tydfil.

Ties

Replays

2nd replay

2nd round

Ties

Replays

3rd round

Ties

Replay

4th round

Ties

Semi finals

First leg

Second leg

Final

References

General
 Football Club History Database: FA Trophy 1974-75

Specific

1974–75 domestic association football cups
League
1974-75